Javier Torres may refer to:
 Javier Torres Félix, imprisoned Mexican drug lord
 Javier Torres (dancer), ballet dancer from Cuba
 Javier Torres Maldonado, Mexican composer

See also
 Xavier Torres (disambiguation)